= Sickle cell advocacy organizations in Africa =

Organizations advocating for people affected by sickle cell disease in Africa

Sickle Cell Advocacy Organizations in Africa
- Type: Health advocacy organizations
- Purpose: Sickle cell disease awareness, Advocacy, Research and patient support
- Region served: Africa

Sickle cell advocacy organizations in Africa are non-governmental organizations, patient groups, charitable foundations, and research networks that promote awareness, prevention, treatment, and policy development related to sickle cell disease (SCD) across the African continent.

== Background ==
Africa bears the largest global burden of sickle cell disease, accounting for most affected births worldwide.

The disease is particularly prevalent in sub-Saharan Africa, where advocacy organizations have emerged to improve public awareness, healthcare access, and research collaboration.

== Regional organizations ==
=== Africa Sickle Cell Alliance ===
The Africa Sickle Cell Alliance (ASA) is a pan-African network of patient groups, healthcare professionals, caregivers, and advocacy organizations working to improve policies and healthcare services for people living with sickle cell disease across Africa.

=== SickleInAfrica ===
SickleInAfrica is a pan-African research consortium that coordinates collaborative research and clinical programs on sickle cell disease. The initiative includes the Sickle Pan-African Research Consortium (SPARCO) and the Sickle Africa Data Coordinating Center (SADaCC).

== National organizations ==
=== Sickle Cell Foundation Nigeria ===
The Sickle Cell Foundation Nigeria (SCFN) is a non-profit organization based in Lagos, Nigeria, providing advocacy, screening, counseling, and patient support services.

=== Sickle Cell Advocacy and Management Initiative ===
The Sickle Cell Advocacy and Management Initiative (SAMI) supports individuals living with sickle cell disease through awareness campaigns, counseling, and community outreach.

=== Sickle Cell Hope Alive Foundation ===
The Sickle Cell Hope Alive Foundation (SCHAF) is a Nigerian non-profit organization focused on patient support, public awareness, and community screening programs.

=== Sickle Cell Support Society of Nigeria ===
The Sickle Cell Support Society of Nigeria (SCSN) promotes awareness and improved standards of care for sickle cell disease in Nigeria.
